Aleksandr Kogan (born February 26, 1969, Orsk, Orenburg Oblast) is a Russian political figure and deputy of the 8th State Duma. In 2005, he was granted a Candidate of Sciences in Economics degree.

From 1998 to 2003, he was the deputy of the Legislative Assembly of the Orenburg Region. In 2002–2003, he was the deputy of the Orenburg City Council. In 2003, he was appointed deputy of the 4th State Duma from the Orenburg constituency. In 2007, he was re-elected for the 5th State Duma. In 2008–2016, he was a member of the general and supreme council of the United Russia party. From January to May 2012, he was the Advisor to the Minister of Economic Development of the Russian Federation. In 2012–2013, he served as the Minister of the Government of the Moscow Oblast for shared-equity housing construction and dilapidated housing. In April 2015, he was appointed Minister of Ecology and Natural Resources of the Moscow Oblast. In 2018, he became the Advisor to the Governor of the Moscow Oblast. Since September 2021, he has served as deputy of the 8th State Duma.

References

1969 births
Living people
United Russia politicians
21st-century Russian politicians
Eighth convocation members of the State Duma (Russian Federation)
People from Ivanovo